Ponsonby's Column, also known as Ponsonby's Cenotaph, was a monumental column in Valletta, Malta. It was built in 1838 as a memorial to Major-General Sir Frederick Cavendish Ponsonby, a former Governor of Malta, but it was destroyed by lightning in 1864. Its plinth survived, and is now located near Hastings Gardens.

History
Major-General
Sir Frederick Cavendish Ponsonby, an Anglo-Irish aristocrat, was appointed Governor of Malta on 15 February 1827. While Ponsonby was in England in 1836, he resigned from the post of Governor, and died suddenly on 11 January of the following year.

In 1838, a column was built in honour of the dead Governor on St. Andrew's Bastion, overlooking Marsamxett Harbour. Its architect is not known, but it could have been designed by Giorgio Pullicino. The monument consisted of a 70-foot-high Doric column on a plinth, surmounted by an urn. The main inscription read:

In January 1864, the column was struck by lightning, and it was subsequently demolished. The plinth remained intact, but in November 1888 it was removed from St. Andrew's Bastion to make way for new gun emplacements on the bastion. The plinth was reassembled near Hastings Gardens on St. Michael's Bastion, and the following inscription was added:

The plinth was damaged by shrapnel during aerial bombardment in World War II. It was restored a number of times over the years, most recently in 2013 under the sponsorship of the Bank of Valletta. The plinth is listed as a Grade 1 national monument by MEPA.

See also
Spencer Monument

References

External links

Monumental columns
Buildings and structures in Valletta
Monuments and memorials in Malta
Neoclassical architecture in Malta
Buildings and structures completed in 1838
Buildings and structures demolished in 1864
Demolished buildings and structures in Malta
1838 establishments in Malta
1864 disestablishments in Malta